SMS Friedrich der Grosse was the second vessel of the  of dreadnought battleships of the German Imperial Navy. Friedrich der Grosses keel was laid on 26 January 1910 at the AG Vulcan dockyard in Hamburg, her hull was launched on 10 June 1911, and she was commissioned into the fleet on 15 October 1912. Friedrich der Grosse was assigned to III Battle Squadron of the High Seas Fleet for the majority of World War I, and served as fleet flagship from her commissioning until 1917.

In 1917, the new battleship  replaced Friedrich der Grosse as the fleet flagship.

After Germany's defeat in the war and the signing of the Armistice in November 1918, Friedrich der Grosse and most of the capital ships of the High Seas Fleet were interned by the British Royal Navy in Scapa Flow. The ships were disarmed and reduced to skeleton crews while the Allied powers negotiated the final version of the Treaty of Versailles. On 21 June 1919, days before the treaty was signed, the commander of the interned fleet, Rear Admiral Ludwig von Reuter, ordered the fleet to be scuttled to ensure that the British would not be able to seize the ships. Friedrich der Grosse was raised in 1936 and broken up for scrap metal. Her bell was returned to Germany in 1965 and is now located at the Fleet Headquarters in Glücksburg.

Design 

She was powered by three sets of AEG Curtis turbines, supplied with steam by sixteen coal-fired water-tube boilers.

The ship was armed with a main battery of ten 30.5 cm SK L/50 guns in five twin turrets. She disposed with the inefficient hexagonal turret arrangement of previous German battleships; instead, three of the five turrets were mounted on the centerline, with two of them arranged in a superfiring pair aft. The other two turrets were placed en echelon amidships, such that both could fire on the broadside. The ship was also armed with a secondary battery of fourteen  SK L/45 guns in casemates amidships. For close-range defense against torpedo boats, she carried eight  SK L/45 guns in casemates. The ship was also armed with four 8.8 cm L/45 anti-aircraft guns. Her armament was rounded out by five  torpedo tubes, all mounted in the ship's hull; one was in the bow, and the other four were on the broadside.

Friedrich der Grosses conning tower was heavily armored, with  sides. As with the other four ships in her class, Friedrich der Grosse carried anti-torpedo nets until after the Battle of Jutland in 1916.

Service history 
Ordered under the contract name Ersatz Heimdall as a replacement for the obsolete coastal defense ship , Friedrich der Grosse was laid down at the AG Vulcan dockyard in Hamburg on 26 January 1910. She was launched on 10 June 1911, after which AG Vulcan conducted builder's trials. At her launching ceremony, Princess Alexandra Victoria performed the christening and Field Marshal Colmar Freiherr von der Goltz gave a speech. She was then transferred to Wilhelmshaven and commissioned into the fleet on 15 October 1912. Exercises in the Baltic Sea followed; Friedrich der Grosse then went to Kiel for final fitting-out work. On 22 January 1913, the ship was finally ready for active service.

After her commissioning in January 1913, Friedrich der Grosse conducted sea trials before becoming the fleet flagship on 2 March, replacing . The ship participated in her first round of fleet maneuvers in February 1913, which were conducted in the Kattegat and the North Sea. The next month saw another round of exercises, from 12 to 14 March. The ship went into dock for periodic maintenance in April, and was ready for artillery training by the end of the month. Extensive fleet maneuvers were conducted in the North Sea from 5 to 27 May. Friedrich der Grosse, as the Navy's newest battleship, was sent to Kiel for Kiel Week in June. While there, she was visited by the Italian king Victor Emmanuel III and his wife Elena. In mid-July, the fleet conducted its annual summer cruise to Norway, which lasted until mid-August. During the cruise, Friedrich der Grosse visited Balholmen, Norway. The autumn maneuvers followed after the fleet returned; they lasted from 31 August to 9 September. Unit drills and individual ship training were conducted in October and November.

In early 1914, Friedrich der Grosse participated in additional ship and unit training. The annual spring maneuvers were conducted in the North Sea at the end of March. Further fleet exercises followed in April and May in the Baltic and North Seas. The ship again went to Kiel Week that year. Despite the rising international tensions following the assassination of Archduke Franz Ferdinand on 28 June, the High Seas Fleet began its summer cruise to Norway on 13 July. During the last peacetime cruise of the Imperial Navy, the fleet conducted drills off Skagen before proceeding to the Norwegian fjords on 25 July. The following day the fleet began to steam back to Germany, as a result of Austria-Hungary's ultimatum to Serbia. On the 27th, the entire fleet assembled off Cape Skudenes before returning to port, where they remained at a heightened state of readiness. War between Austria-Hungary and Serbia broke out the following day, and in the span of a week all of the major European powers had joined the conflict.

World War I 
The High Seas Fleet, including Friedrich der Grosse, conducted a number of sweeps and advances into the North Sea. The first occurred on 2–3 November 1914, though no British forces were encountered. Admiral Friedrich von Ingenohl, the commander of the High Seas Fleet, adopted a strategy in which the battlecruisers of Rear Admiral Franz von Hipper's I Scouting Group raided British coastal towns to lure out portions of the Grand Fleet where they could be destroyed by the High Seas Fleet. The raid on Scarborough, Hartlepool and Whitby on 15–16 December 1914 was the first such operation. On the evening of 15 December, the German battle fleet of some twelve dreadnoughts—including Friedrich der Grosse and her four sisters—and eight pre-dreadnoughts came to within  of an isolated squadron of six British battleships. Skirmishes between the rival destroyer screens in the darkness convinced von Ingenohl that he was faced with the entire Grand Fleet. Under orders from Kaiser Wilhelm II to avoid risking the fleet unnecessarily, von Ingenohl broke off the engagement and turned the battle fleet back toward Germany.

Admiral Hugo von Pohl replaced him as commander of the fleet. Admiral von Pohl conducted a series of fleet advances in 1915 in which Friedrich der Grosse took part; in the first one on 29–30 March, the fleet steamed out to the north of Terschelling and return without incident. Another followed on 17–18 April, where Friedrich der Grosse and the rest of the fleet covered a mining operation by II Scouting Group. Three days later, on 21–22 April, the High Seas Fleet advanced toward Dogger Bank, though again failed to meet any British forces.

II Scouting Group performed another minelaying operation on 17–18 May, and Friedrich der Grosse and the rest of the fleet steamed out in support. The fleet remained in port until 10 August, when it sortied to Helgoland to cover the return of the auxiliary cruiser . A month later, on 11–12 September, the fleet covered another mine-laying operation off the Swarte Bank. The last operation of the year, conducted on 23–24 October, was an advance without result in the direction of Horns Reef.

On 11 January 1916, Admiral Reinhard Scheer replaced von Pohl, who was suffering from liver cancer. A week later on the 18th, Scheer hoisted his flag aboard Friedrich der Grosse. Scheer proposed a more aggressive policy designed to force a confrontation with the British Grand Fleet; he received approval from the Kaiser in February. The first of Scheer's operations was conducted the following month, on 5–7 March, with an uneventful sweep of the Hoofden. On 25–26 March, Scheer attempted to attack British forces that had raided Tondern, but failed to locate them. Another advance to Horns Reef followed on 21–22 April.

On 24 April, the battlecruisers of Von Hipper's I Scouting Group conducted a raid on the English coast. Friedrich der Grosse and the rest of the fleet sailed in distant support. The battlecruiser  struck a mine while en route to the target, and had to withdraw. The other battlecruisers bombarded the town of Lowestoft unopposed but, during the approach to Yarmouth, they encountered the British cruisers of the Harwich Force. A short artillery duel ensued before the Harwich Force withdrew. Reports of British submarines in the area prompted the retreat of I Scouting Group. At this point, Scheer, who had been warned of the sortie of the Grand Fleet from its base in Scapa Flow, also withdrew to safer German waters.

Battle of Jutland 

Soon after the Lowestoft raid, Scheer began planning another foray into the North Sea. He had initially intended to launch the operation in mid-May, by which time the mine damage to Seydlitz was scheduled to be repaired—Scheer was unwilling to embark on a major raid without his battlecruiser forces at full strength. On 9 May, several battleships developed problems with their engines, which delayed the operation further, to 23 May. By 22 May, Seydlitz was still not fully repaired and the operation was again postponed, to 29 May. At noon on 29 May, the repairs to Seydlitz were finally completed, and the ship returned to I Scouting Group. The plan called for Hipper's battlecruisers to steam north to the Skagerrak, with the intention of luring out a portion of the British fleet so it could be destroyed by Scheer's waiting battleships.

Friedrich der Grosse was the eighth ship in the German line; the four  ships of the V Division, III Battle Squadron, led the line, followed by four Kaiser-class ships in the VI Division, III Battle Squadron. The eight - and s constituted I Squadron, which was followed by the six elderly pre-dreadnoughts of Rear Admiral Franz Mauve's II Squadron. Hipper's five battlecruisers, the scouting force for the fleet, left the Jade estuary at 02:00 on 31 May; Scheer and the High Seas Fleet followed an hour and a half later.

Shortly before 16:00 the battlecruisers of I Scouting Group encountered the British 1st Battlecruiser Squadron under the command of Vice Admiral Sir David Beatty. By this time, the German battlecruisers were steaming south to draw the British ships toward the main body of the High Seas Fleet. At 17:30, Königs crew spotted both I Scouting Group and the 1st Battlecruiser Squadron approaching. The German battlecruisers were steaming to starboard, while the British ships steamed to port. At 17:45, Scheer ordered a two-point turn to port to bring his ships closer to the British battlecruisers and the accompanying fast battleships of the 5th Battle Squadron; a minute later, he gave the order to open fire.

Friedrich der Grosse was still out of range of both the British battlecruisers and the 5th Battle Squadron, and so held her fire initially. Between 17:48 and 17:52, Friedrich der Grosse and ten other battleships engaged the 2nd Light Cruiser Squadron, though only  managed to score a hit during this period. Friedrich der Grosse and her three sisters targeted Nomad and quickly sank her. Nestor was similarly dispatched by the I Squadron ships. Shortly after 19:00, a melee between the German line and British cruisers took place. The center of the action was the damaged German cruiser , which had been disabled by a shell from the British battlecruiser . Rear Admiral Behncke in König attempted to maneuver III Squadron to cover the stricken cruiser. Simultaneously, the British 3rd and 4th Light Cruiser Squadrons began a torpedo attack on the German line; while advancing to torpedo range, they smothered Wiesbaden with fire from their main guns. The eight III Squadron battleships fired on the British cruisers, but even the sustained fire from the battleships' main guns failed to drive off the British cruisers. In this period, Warspite was hit by 13 heavy shells, though the ships that fired them are unknown.

The series of reversals in course and confused maneuvers disorganized the fleet and inverted the sequence of ships, but by 23:30 the fleet had reached its cruising formation. Friedrich der Grosse was now the ninth ship in a line of twenty-four, headed by the eight I Squadron ships. Shortly after 01:00, the British cruiser Black Prince stumbled into the German line. Searchlights aboard  illuminated the target; Friedrich der Grosse, Thüringen, Nassau, and Ostfriesland hammered the cruiser at point-blank range with main and secondary guns. In the span of a few minutes Black Prince exploded and sank, taking her entire crew of 857 with her.

After a series of night engagements between the I Squadron battleships and British destroyers, the High Seas Fleet punched through the British light forces and reached Horns Reef by 04:00 on 1 June. The German fleet reached Wilhelmshaven a few hours later; five of the I Squadron battleships took up defensive positions in the outer roadstead, and Kaiser, Kaiserin, Prinzregent Luitpold, and Kronprinz stood ready just outside the entrance to Wilhelmshaven. The rest of the fleet entered Wilhelmshaven, where Friedrich der Grosse and the other ships still in fighting condition replenished their stocks of coal and ammunition. In the course of the battle, Friedrich der Grosse had fired 72 main battery shells and 151 rounds from her secondary guns. She emerged from the battle completely undamaged.

Subsequent North Sea operations 
On 18 August 1916, Friedrich der Grosse took part in an operation to bombard Sunderland. Scheer, in Friedrich der Grosse, would trail behind with the rest of the fleet and provide support. During the action of 19 August 1916, Scheer turned north after receiving a false report from a zeppelin about a British unit in the area. As a result, the bombardment was not carried out, and by 14:35, Scheer had been warned of the Grand Fleet's approach and so turned his forces around and retreated to German ports.

Another fleet operation took place on 18–19 October, though it ended without encountering any British units. The fleet was reorganized on 1 December; the four König-class battleships remained in III Squadron, along with the newly commissioned , while the five Kaiser-class ships, including Friedrich der Grosse, were transferred to IV Squadron. In March 1917 the new battleship , built to serve as fleet flagship, entered service; on the 17th, Scheer hauled down his flag from Friedrich der Grosse and transferred it to Baden. On 4–5 July, crewmen aboard Friedrich der Grosse staged a hunger strike in protest over the poor quality and insufficient quantity of the food they were given. The ship's officers relented, fed the crew a meal of groat soup and agreed to form a Menagekommission, a council that gave the enlisted men a voice in their ration selection and preparation. Further insubordination on several vessels followed on 11 July, and the ringleaders were arrested and put on trial. Max Reichpietsch, a stoker from Friedrich der Grosse was sentenced to death and executed by firing squad on 5 September in Cologne.

Operation Albion 

In early September 1917, following the German conquest of the Russian port of Riga, the German navy decided to eliminate the Russian naval forces that still held the Gulf of Riga. The Admiralstab (Navy High Command) planned an operation to seize the Baltic island of Ösel, and specifically the Russian gun batteries on the Sworbe Peninsula. The Admiralstab issued orders on 18 September for a joint operation with the army to capture Ösel and Moon Islands; the primary naval component was to comprise the flagship, Moltke, and III and IV Battle Squadrons of the High Seas Fleet. Along with nine light cruisers, three torpedo boat flotillas, and dozens of mine warfare ships, the entire force numbered some 300 ships, supported by over 100 aircraft and six zeppelins. The invasion force amounted to approximately 24,600 officers and enlisted men. The garrison on Ösel numbered some 14,000 men.

The operation began on the morning of 12 October, when Moltke and the III Squadron ships engaged Russian positions in Tagga Bay while Friedrich der Grosse and the rest of IV Squadron shelled Russian gun batteries on the Sworbe Peninsula on Ösel. The coastal artillery in both locations were quickly silenced by the battleships' heavy guns. On the morning of the 14th, Friedrich der Grosse, Kaiserin, and König Albert were detached to support German troops advancing toward Anseküll. The three ships fired on the battery at Zerel for an hour, which prompted most of the Russian gun crews to flee their posts.

By 20 October, the fighting on the islands was winding down; Moon, Ösel, and Dagö were in German possession. The previous day, the Admiralstab had ordered the cessation of naval actions and the return of the dreadnoughts to the High Seas Fleet as soon as possible. On 27 October, Friedrich der Grosse was detached from the Baltic and returned to the North Sea. Upon her return, she resumed guard duties. The ship participated in the fruitless advance to Norway on 23–25 April 1918. Afterward, she went into drydock for extensive maintenance, which lasted from 26 July to 28 September.

Fate 

Friedrich der Grosse and her four sisters were to have taken part in a final fleet action at the end of October 1918, days before the Armistice was to take effect. The bulk of the High Seas Fleet was to have sortied from their base in Wilhelmshaven to engage the British Grand Fleet; Scheer—by now the Grossadmiral (Grand Admiral) of the fleet—intended to inflict as much damage as possible on the British navy, to ensure a better bargaining position for Germany, despite the expected casualties. However, many of the war-weary sailors felt the operation would disrupt the peace process and prolong the war. On the morning of 29 October 1918, the order was given to sail from Wilhelmshaven the following day. Starting on the night of 29 October, sailors on Thüringen and then on several other battleships mutinied. On the 30th, crewmen aboard Friedrich der Grosse engaged in forms of passive resistance, including a "go-slow" while replenishing the ship's coal stock. The unrest ultimately forced Hipper and Scheer to cancel the operation. Informed of the situation, the Kaiser stated "I no longer have a navy."

Following the capitulation of Germany in November 1918, most of the High Seas Fleet, under the command of Rear Admiral Ludwig von Reuter, were interned in the British naval base in Scapa Flow. Prior to the departure of the German fleet, Admiral Adolf von Trotha made clear to Von Reuter that he could not allow the Allies to seize the ships, under any conditions. The fleet rendezvoused with the British light cruiser , which led the ships to the Allied fleet that was to escort the Germans to Scapa Flow. The massive flotilla consisted of some 370 British, American, and French warships. Once the ships were interned, their guns were disabled through the removal of their breech blocks, and their crews were reduced to 200 officers and enlisted men.

The fleet remained in captivity during the negotiations that ultimately produced the Treaty of Versailles. Von Reuter believed that the British intended to seize the German ships on 21 June 1919, which was the deadline for Germany to sign the peace treaty. Unaware that the deadline had been extended to the 23rd, Reuter ordered the ships to be sunk at the next opportunity. On the morning of 21 June, the British fleet left Scapa Flow to conduct training maneuvers, and at 11:20 Reuter transmitted the order to his ships. Friedrich der Grosse capsized and sank at 12:16. In 1936, the ship was raised and broken up for scrap; the work was completed by 29 April 1937. On 30 August 1965, Britain returned the ship's bell to Germany via the frigate ; it now resides at the Fleet Headquarters of the German Navy in Glücksburg.

Footnotes

Notes

Citations

References

Further reading

External links 

 DreadnoughtProject.org eight high resolution dockyard drawings.

1911 ships
Frederick the Great
Kaiser-class battleships
Ships built in Hamburg
World War I battleships of Germany
World War I warships scuttled at Scapa Flow
Maritime incidents in 1919